Harry's Choice! is a studio album by American trumpeter Harry James with The Harry James Orchestra. The album was recorded in Hollywood, California in June, 1958 and released by Capitol Records on stereo LP (ST-1093), mono LP (T-1093), and a series of three EPs (EAP 1-1093, EAP 2-1093 and EAP 3-1093).

After coasting through the mid-1950s, James made a complete reevaluation of where he was heading in his musical career.  Count Basie provided the impetus by making a significant comeback with his newly formed "16 Men Swinging" band, and James wanted a band with a decided Basie flavor. This album is the third of several released on Capitol Records representative of the Basie style that James adopted during this period, with some of the arrangements provided by former Basie saxophonist and arranger Ernie Wilkins, whom James hired for his own band.

Track listing

Personnel

Harry James - leader, trumpet 
Willie Smith, Bob Poland, Ernie Small, Herb Lorden, Sam Firmature - saxophone
Bob Wolfe, Nick Buono, Ollie Mitchell - trumpet
Bob Edmondson, Ernie Tack, Ray Sims - trombone
Jack Perciful - piano
Dennis Budimir - guitar
Russ Phillips - bass
Jackie Mills - drums

References

Jazz albums by American artists
1958 albums
Capitol Records albums
Albums arranged by Ernie Wilkins
Big band albums